Sir Osmond Elim d'Avigdor-Goldsmid, 1st Baronet DL JP (9 August 1877 – 14 April 1940) was a British financier and baronet.

Life 
D'Avigdor-Goldsmid was born to Jewish parents Elim Henry d'Avigdor Goldsmid. He was educated at Harrow School and Trinity Hall, Cambridge.

First World War 
D'Avigdor-Goldsmid served in the France during the First World War (1914–19). He reached the rank of Lieutenant Colonel and was twice mentioned in dispatches.

Public life 
He served as High Sheriff of Kent in 1912, Chairman of the Jewish Colonisation Association (1919), President of the Anglo-Jewish Association (1921–26), President of the British Board of Deputies of British Jews (1926–33), and Treasurer of the Jewish Memorial Council.

Baronetcy 
Born Osmond d'Avigdor, he "added the name Goldsmid on inheriting the estates of his cousin Sir Julian Goldsmid". He was created a Baronet of Somerhill in the County of Kent on 22 January 1934.

Personal life 
He was a member of the Athenæum.

References

1877 births
1940 deaths
British Jews
Baronets in the Baronetage of the United Kingdom
Osmond
High Sheriffs of Kent